Jeffrey Moussaieff Masson (born March 28, 1941 as Jeffrey Lloyd Masson) is an American author. Masson is best known for his conclusions about Sigmund Freud and psychoanalysis. In his The Assault on Truth (1984), Masson argues that Freud may have abandoned his seduction theory because he feared that granting the truth of his female patients' claims (that they had been sexually abused) would hinder the acceptance of his psychoanalytic methods. Masson is a veganism advocate and has written about animal rights.

Early life
Jeffrey Masson is the son of Jacques Masson, a Frenchman of Bukharian Jewish ancestry, and Diana (Dina) Zeiger from an Ashkenazi strict Orthodox Jewish family. Both of his parents were followers of the guru Paul Brunton. Masson's mother later became a follower of mystic and philosopher John Levy. During the 1940s and 1950s, Brunton often lived with them, eventually designating Masson as his heir apparent. In 1956, Diana and Jacques Masson moved to Uruguay because Brunton believed that a third world war was imminent. Jeffrey and his sister Linda followed in 1959.

Studies
At Brunton's urging, Masson went to Harvard University to study Sanskrit. While at Harvard, Masson became disillusioned with Brunton. Brunton and his influence on the Masson family form the subject of Masson's autobiographical book My Father's Guru: A Journey Through Spirituality and Disillusion. Harvard University granted Masson a B.A. in 1964 and a PhD with Honors in 1970. His degrees were in Sanskrit and Indian Studies. While undertaking his PhD, Masson also studied, supported by fellowships, at the École Normale Supérieure in Paris, the University of Calcutta, and the University of Poona.

Career
Masson taught Sanskrit and Indian Studies at the University of Toronto, 1969–80, reaching the rank of Professor. He has also held short term appointments at Brown University, the University of California, and the University of Michigan. From 1981 to 1992, he was a Research Associate, Department of South and Southeast Asian Studies, at the University of California, Berkeley. He is currently an Honorary Fellow in the Department of Philosophy at the University of Auckland in New Zealand.

Views on Freud's seduction theory 
In 1970, Masson began studying to become a psychoanalyst at the Toronto Psychoanalytic Institute, completing a full clinical training course in 1978. His training analyst was Irvine Schiffer, a well-known Toronto analyst and author of books on the unconscious aspects of charisma and time. In 1990 Masson published an autobiographical book in which he accused Schiffer of cursing, being constantly late for sessions, and intimidating Masson when the latter complained about this issue. Schiffer denied it and debated Masson on the Canadian television program The Fifth Estate.

During this time, Masson befriended the psychoanalyst Kurt Eissler and became acquainted with Sigmund Freud's daughter Anna Freud. Eissler designated Masson to succeed him as Director of the Sigmund Freud Archives after his and Anna Freud's deaths. Masson learned German and studied the history of psychoanalysis. In 1980 Masson was appointed Projects Director of the Freud Archives, with full access to Freud's correspondence and other unpublished papers. While perusing this material, Masson concluded that Freud might have rejected the seduction theory in order to advance the cause of psychoanalysis and to maintain his own place within the psychoanalytic inner circle, after a hostile response from the renowned sex-pathologist Richard von Krafft-Ebing and the rest of the Vienna Psychiatric Society in 1896 — "an icy reception from the jackasses," was the way Freud described it later to Fliess.

In 1981, Masson's controversial conclusions were discussed in a series of New York Times articles by Ralph Blumenthal, to the dismay of the psychoanalytic establishment. Masson was subsequently dismissed from his position as project director of the Freud Archives and stripped of his membership in psychoanalytic professional societies. Masson was defended by Alice Miller
and Muriel Gardiner ("While striving not to take sides," Gardiner said, "I consider him a good and energetic worker and a worthwhile scholar").

Masson later wrote several books critical of psychoanalysis, including The Assault on Truth: Freud's Suppression of the Seduction Theory. In the introduction to The Assault on Truth, Masson challenged his critics to address his arguments: "My pessimistic conclusions may possibly be wrong. The documents may in fact allow a very different reading." Janet Malcolm interviewed Masson at length when writing her long New Yorker article on this controversy, which she later expanded into In the Freud Archives, a book that also dealt with Eissler and Peter Swales. Masson sued The New Yorker for defamation, claiming that Malcolm had misquoted him. The ensuing trial drew considerable attention. The decade-long, US$10 million lawsuit came to a close in 1994 when the court ruled in The New Yorker‘s favor. "The Court of Appeals affirmed ... that Malcolm had deliberately altered each quotation not found on the tape recordings, but nevertheless held that petitioner failed to raise a jury question of actual malice." Subsequent to the case, Janet Malcolm claimed to have found her handwritten notes indicating that Masson had lied in relation to the remaining disputed quotations, as he had lied in relation to quotations where there were recordings.

In 1985, Masson edited and translated Freud's complete correspondence with Wilhelm Fliess after having convinced Anna Freud to make it available in full. He also looked up the original places and documents in La Salpêtrière Hospital in Paris, where Freud had studied with Charcot. Masson writes that the scientific community has been largely silent about his views, and that he suffered personal attacks once he deviated from the traditional views on the seduction theory and the history of psychoanalysis. Both the traditional view and Masson's case against it are built on the account that Freud's seduction theory patients reported having been sexually abused in early childhood; several Freud scholars have disputed this account.

Later work 
Since the early 1990s, Masson has written a number of books on the emotional life of animals, one of which, When Elephants Weep, has been translated into 20 languages. He has explained this radical change in the subject of his writings as follows:

In 2008, Masson became a Director of Voiceless, the animal protection institute.  "We are not encouraged, on a daily basis, to pay careful attention to the animals we eat. On the contrary, the meat, dairy, and egg industries all actively encourage us to give thought to our own immediate interest (taste, for example, or cheap food) but not to the real suffering involved ... The animals involved suffer agony because of our ignorance. The least we owe them is to lessen that ignorance".

Masson also wrote a book about living in New Zealand, including an interview with Sir Edmund Hillary.

Personal life 
Masson is married to Leila Masson, a German pediatrician. They have two sons. He also has a daughter by a previous marriage with Therese Claire Masson. In the early 1990s, Masson had been engaged to University of Michigan feminist legal scholar Catharine MacKinnon, who wrote the preface to his A Dark Science: Women, Sexuality, and Psychiatry in the Nineteenth Century.

Masson became a vegan in 2004. He is an animal rights activist.

Name 
Masson's great-grandfather Shlomo Moussaieff was a kabbalist and founder of the Bukharian Quarter in Jerusalem. His grandfather Henry Mousaieff changed his family name from Moussaieff to Masson. Masson changed his middle name from Lloyd to Moussaieff.

Works 
 1974. "India and the Unconscious: Erik Erikson on Gandhi," International Journal of Psycho-Analysis 55: 519-26. Discussion by T. C. Sinha: 527.
 1974. "Sex and Yoga: Psychoanalysis and the Indian Religious Experience", Journal of Indian Philosophy 2: 307–320. Reprinted in Vishnu on Freud's Desk: A Reader in Psychoanalysis and Hinduism, T.G. Vaidyanathan and Jeffrey J. Kripal eds. Oxford University Press, Paperback (Edition: 2003)
 1976. "Perversions — some observations", Israel Ann. Psychiat. rel. Disc., (1976b), 14, 354-61.
 1976. (with Terri C. Masson) "The Navel of Neurosis: Trauma, Memory and Denial", paper presented to the San Francisco Psychoanalytic Society
 1978. (with Terri C. Masson) "Buried Memories on the Acropolis. Freud's Relation to Mysticism and Anti-Semitism", International Journal of Psycho-Analysis 59: 199-208.
 1980. The Oceanic Feeling: The Origins of Religious Sentiment in Ancient India.
 1981. The Peacock's Egg: Love Poems from Ancient India, W. S. Merwin and J. Moussaieff Masson, eds. 
 1984. The Assault on Truth: Freud's Suppression of the Seduction Theory. Farrar Straus & Giroux. 
 1984. "Freud and the Seduction Theory A challenge to the foundations of psychoanalysis," The Atlantic Monthly, February 1984.
 1985. (editor and translator) The Complete Letters of Sigmund Freud to Wilhelm Fliess, 1887-1904. 
 1986. A Dark Science: Women, Sexuality and Psychiatry in the Nineteenth Century. 
 1988. Against Therapy: Emotional Tyranny and the Myth of Psychological Healing. 
 1990. Final Analysis: The Making and Unmaking of A Psychoanalyst. Addison-Wesley. 
 1993. My Father's Guru: A Journey Through Spirituality and Disillusion, Addison-Wesley. 
 1994. (with Susan McCarthy) When Elephants Weep: The Emotional Life of Animals, Jonathan Cape.
 1995. "A Note on U.G. Krishnamurti"
 1996. Lost Prince: The Unsolved Mystery of Kaspar Hauser.
 1997. Dogs Never Lie About Love: Reflections on the Emotional World of Dogs.
 1999. The Emperor's Embrace: Reflections on Animal Families and Fatherhood.
 2003. The Pig Who Sang to the Moon: The Emotional World of Farm Animals.
 2002. The Nine Emotional Lives of Cats: A Journey Into the Feline Heart. 
 2004. The Evolution of Fatherhood: A Celebration of Animal and Human Families.
 2004. Slipping into Paradise: Why I live in New Zealand. 
 2004. The Cat Who Came in from the Cold. Wheeler. 
 2005. Raising the Peaceable Kingdom: What Animals Can Teach Us about the Social Origins of Tolerance and Friendship.
 2006. Altruistic Armadillos - Zen-Like Zebras: A Menagerie of 100 Favorite Animals. 
 2009. The Face on Your Plate: The Truth about Food. 
 2010. "On Alice Miller"
 2010. The Dog Who Couldn't Stop Loving: How Dogs Have Captured Our Hearts for Thousands of Years. 
 2010. (editor) Sigmund Freud: The Interpretation of Dreams: The Illustrated Edition. 
 2010 Altruistic Armadillos, Zenlike Zebras-Understanding the World's Most Intriguing Animals. Skyhorse Publishing. 
 2011 "Pornography and Animals", in 
 2014 Beasts: What Animals Can Teach Us About the Origins of Good and Evil. Bloomsbury Publishing. 
2020 Lost Companions: Reflections on the Death of Pets. Murdoch Books.

Reviews of his books 
 The Complete Letters of Sigmund Freud to Wilhelm Fliess, 1887-1904: By William McGrath.
 Against Therapy:
 By Jeanne Stubbs.
 By Wray Herbert.
 Final Analysis: By Michael Sacks.
 Breaking Away From the Cult: By Carol Tavris.

See also 
 List of animal rights advocates
 List of vegans

References

Further reading 
 
 
  First published in 1984 by Alfred A. Knopf.

External links 

 Jeffrey Masson's website 

Articles
 "Scholars seek the hidden Freud in newly emerging letters." The first of two articles in The New York Times by Ralph Blumenthal, published August 18, 1981.
 "Till Press Do Us Part: The Trial of Janet Malcolm and Jeffrey Masson."
Interviews
 Transcript of an interview: Jeffrey Masson talking with Kirsten Garrett about Sigmund Freud and Emma Eckstein/ first broadcast on The Science Show in 1986, second broadcast 3 June 2006 presented by Robyn Williams
 A conversation about the lives of animals with Susan McCarthy and Jeffrey Moussaieff Mason on Jun 30, 1995, Duration 60 min (Audio)
 "Walking on the Beach with Jeffrey Masson's Cats," November 14, 2002
 "Conversation between Masson and Richard Fidler. Related Audio, December 14, 2007.
 "Episode 6: Human and the Beast", Masson interviewed by Siobhan O'Sullivan for the Knowing Animals podcast

1941 births
Living people
American animal rights scholars
American people of French-Jewish descent
American male non-fiction writers
American veganism activists
Animal cognition writers
Anti-psychiatry
Writers from Chicago
Harvard University alumni
University of Michigan faculty
American memoirists
American autobiographers
American psychoanalysts
Jewish psychoanalysts
American Sanskrit scholars
Academic staff of the University of Toronto
Brown University faculty
Translators of Sigmund Freud
Jewish activists